Witklip Pass is situated in the Mpumalanga province, on the R36 road between Machadodorp and Lydenburg (South Africa).

Mountain passes of Mpumalanga